Kilworth is a village in north County Cork, located about 2 kilometres north of Fermoy near the river Funcheon. The M8 Cork–Dublin motorway passes nearby. Kilworth has an army camp, located on the R639 regional road between Mitchelstown and Fermoy. Kilworth is part of the Cork East Dáil constituency.

History
The name Kilworth comes from the Irish language term "Cill Úird", literally meaning "church of the order". In the seventeenth and eighteenth centuries, Kilworth was a notable settlement on the old Dublin to Cork road, prior to the construction of the T6/old N8/R639 road from Fermoy to Cashel and from Cashel to Urlingford between 1739 and the mid-nineteenth century. Numerous accounts and maps dating from the 1680s tell of armies and travellers journeying from Fermoy to Clogheen and onwards to Dublin via Kilworth and Kilworth Mountain.

Amenities and attractions
Kilworth Arts centre is a theatre venue in the centre of the village. It was previously used as a church.

Kilworth (Glenseskin) forest is located about 1 km from the village centre.

Economy
Teagasc has an agricultural research facility based at Moorepark, just outside Kilworth. The village is within commuting distance of many centres of employment, including Cork city.

Notable people
Redmond Barry (1813–1880), the colonial judge who sentenced Ned Kelly in Australia, was from Ballyclogh House near Kilworth.
David Richard Pigot (c.1796–1873), judge who was Chief Baron of the Irish Exchequer. His eldest son, John Edward Pigot, was also born in Kilworth and was one of the founders of the National Gallery of Ireland.
Gearoid Towey (b.1977), three-time Olympian, attended primary school in Kilworth and has a monument in the village commemorating his 2001 World Championship victory.

See also
 List of towns and villages in Ireland

References

Towns and villages in County Cork
Civil parishes of County Cork